The 2000–01 Hong Kong First Division League season was the 90th since its establishment. The season began on 2 August 2000 and ended on 2 June 2001.

First stage

Second stage

NB: Teams take points and goals halved from first phase. GF and GA is rounded.

Championship playoff

Relegation playoff

Final

References
 www.rsssf.com Hongkong 2000/01
  2000–2001年　香港リーグ

Hong Kong First Division League seasons
Hong Kong First Division League, 2000-01
First Division